The 1958 North Carolina Tar Heels football team represented the University of North Carolina at Chapel Hill during the 1958 NCAA University Division football season. The Tar Heels were led by fourth-year head coach Jim Tatum and played their home games at Kenan Memorial Stadium. The team competed as a member of the Atlantic Coast Conference, finishing in fourth. 

Two-way end Al Goldstein was named a first-team All-American by the Football Writers Association of America and the NEA.

This was Tatum's last year as head coach, as he unexpectedly died at age 46 of a typhus-like illness in July 1959. He had a record of 19–17–3 at UNC.

Schedule

References

North Carolina
North Carolina Tar Heels football seasons
North Carolina Tar Heels football